Haugsdorf is a town in the district of Hollabrunn in Lower Austria, Austria.

Population

References

Cities and towns in Hollabrunn District